Magic Mirror (1999) is a children's picture book by Orson Scott Card and illustrator Nathan Pinnock.

Plot introduction
Magic Mirror is a story about the problems of a mythical family. Although the family is presented as a medieval royal family, their problems reflect present-day concerns and modern world artifacts appear in the pictures.

See also

List of works by Orson Scott Card

External links
 About the book Magic Mirror from Card's website

1999 children's books
Books by Orson Scott Card
American picture books
Fantasy books